The 1985 FIVB Women's World Cup was held from 10 to 20 November 1985 in four cities in Japan such as Sapporo, Iwamizawa, Fukuoka, and Tokyo.

Qualification

Results

|}

Location: Sapporo

|}

Location: Iwamizawa

|}

Location: Sapporo

|}

Location: Fukuoka

|}

Location: Tokyo

|}

Final standing

Awards

 Most Valuable Player
  Lang Ping
 Best Attacker
  Mireya Luis
 Best Blocker
  Gabriela Pérez del Solar
 Best Setter
  Yang Xilan

 Best Server
  Sanae Mitsuo
 Best Receiver
  Ichiko Sato
 Best Coach
  Deng Ruozeng
 Spirit of Fight
  Josefina Capote

External links
 Results

1985 Women
Women's World Cup
V
V
November 1985 sports events in Asia
Women's volleyball in Japan